Young-geun, also spelled Young-keun or Yung-keun, is a Korean masculine given name. Its meaning differs based on the hanja used to write each syllable of the name. There are 34 hanja with the reading "young" and 18 hanja with the reading "geun" on the South Korean government's official list of hanja which may be registered for use in given names.

People with this name include:
Choi Yung-keun (1923–1994), South Korean footballer
Kim Young-geun (born 1978), South Korean footballer
Kim Young-keun (born 1990), South Korean footballer
Song Young-keun, South Korean politician; see List of members of the National Assembly (South Korea), 2012–

See also
List of Korean given names

References